Gunder Anton Johannesen Jahren (8 August 1858 – 20 May 1933) was a Norwegian politician for the Conservative Party. He was Minister of Agriculture 1920–1921. He also represented Østfold in the Norwegian Parliament from 1903 to 1930, and became president of the legislature in 1925.

References

1858 births
1933 deaths
Government ministers of Norway
Ministers of Agriculture and Food of Norway
Presidents of the Storting